Gene Austin Deegan  (born August 3, 1936) is a retired major general in the United States Marine Corps. He attended the United States Naval Academy, graduating in 1958. He served as commanding general of the Marine Corps Air-Ground Combat Center in Twentynine Palms, California.

References

1936 births
Living people
People from Watonwan County, Minnesota
Military personnel from Minnesota
United States Naval Academy alumni
United States Marine Corps generals